The red-faced crimsonwing (Cryptospiza reichenovii) is a common species of estrildid finch found in Africa. It has an estimated global extent of occurrence of 390,000 km2.

It is found in Angola, Burundi, Cameroon, The Democratic Republic of the Congo, Malawi, Mozambique, Niger, Nigeria, Rwanda, Tanzania, Uganda, Zambia and Zimbabwe.

Origin
Origin and phylogeny has been obtained by Antonio Arnaiz-Villena et al.. Estrildinae may have originated in India and dispersed thereafter (towards Africa and Pacific Ocean habitats).

References

External links
BirdLife International species factsheet
Species text in The Atlas of Southern African Birds

red-faced crimsonwing
Birds of the Gulf of Guinea
Birds of Central Africa
Birds of East Africa
Birds of Sub-Saharan Africa
red-faced crimsonwing